Steffi Graf was the defending champion but did not compete that year.

Chris Evert won in the final 2–6, 6–1, 6–1 against Gabriela Sabatini.

Seeds
A champion seed is indicated in bold text while text in italics indicates the round in which that seed was eliminated. The top eight seeds received a bye to the second round.

  Chris Evert (champion)
  Pam Shriver (second round)
  Gabriela Sabatini (final)
  Lori McNeil (quarterfinals)
  Zina Garrison (semifinals)
  Patty Fendick (quarterfinals)
  Anne Minter (quarterfinals)
  Stephanie Rehe (semifinals)
  Catarina Lindqvist (third round)
  Dianne Balestrat (third round)
  Robin White (third round)
  Gretchen Magers (third round)
  Halle Cioffi (third round)
  Sara Gomer (third round)
 n/a
 n/a

Draw

Finals

Top half

Section 1

Section 2

Bottom half

Section 3

Section 4

References
 1988 Virginia Slims of Los Angeles Draw

1988,Singles
1988 WTA Tour
1988 in sports in California
1988 in American tennis